Jhoan Manuel Durán (born January 8, 1998) is a Dominican professional baseball pitcher for the Minnesota Twins of Major League Baseball (MLB).

Career

Arizona Diamondbacks
Durán signed with the Arizona Diamondbacks as an international free agent in December 2014. He made his professional debut in 2015 with the Dominican Summer League Diamondbacks. He played 2016 with the Arizona League Diamondbacks and Missoula Osprey and 2017 with the Arizona League Diamondbacks and Hillsboro Hops. He started 2018 with the Kane County Cougars.

Minnesota Twins
On July 27, 2018, the Diamondbacks traded Durán, Gabriel Maciel and Ernie De La Trinidad to the Minnesota Twins for Eduardo Escobar.

Durán started his Twins career with the Cedar Rapids Kernels. He started 2019 with the Fort Myers Miracle.

Durán was added to the Twins 40-man roster on November 20, 2019. He did not play a minor league game in 2020 since the season was cancelled due to the COVID-19 pandemic. On June 21, 2021, Durán was shut down by Minnesota due to an elbow strain.

On April 4, 2022, it was announced that Durán had made the Twins’ Opening Day roster.

References

External links

1998 births
Living people
Major League Baseball players from the Dominican Republic
Major League Baseball pitchers
Minnesota Twins players
Dominican Summer League Diamondbacks players
Arizona League Diamondbacks players
Missoula Osprey players
Hillsboro Hops players
Kane County Cougars players
Cedar Rapids Kernels players
Fort Myers Miracle players
Pensacola Blue Wahoos players
St. Paul Saints players